Danny Hargrave (birth unknown – 27 January 2019) was a professional rugby league footballer who played in the 1960s and 1970s.

Background
Danny Hargrave's funeral service took place at St. Mary's Church, Church Lane, Kippax, Leeds, LS25 7HF at 11.15am on Tuesday 5 March 2019, followed by a committal in the church's graveyard, and then a reception at Kippax Central working men's club.

Playing career

Challenge Cup Final appearances
Danny Hargrave played as an interchange/substitute, i.e. number 14, (replacing  Alan Hardisty) in Castleford's 7-2 victory over Wigan in the 1970 Challenge Cup Final during the 1969–70 season at Wembley Stadium, London on Saturday 9 May 1970, in front of a crowd of 95,255.

County Cup Final appearances
Danny Hargrave played  in Castleford's 11-22 defeat by Leeds in the 1968 Yorkshire County Cup Final during the 1968–69 season at Belle Vue, Wakefield on Saturday 19 October 1968, and played  in the 7-11 defeat by Hull Kingston Rovers in the 1971 Yorkshire County Cup Final during the 1971–72 season at Belle Vue, Wakefield on Saturday 21 August 1971.

Genealogical information
Danny Hargrave's marriage to Lynn (née Clegg) was registered during third ¼ 1972 in Pontefract district. They had children; the future rugby league footballer who played in the 1990s for Castleford; Spencer Hargrave (birth registered third ¼  in Pontefract district).

Note
Danny Hargraves' actual forename is "David" but he was known as "Danny".

References

External links
Search for "Hargrave" at rugbyleagueproject.org
Search for "Danny Hargrave" at britishnewspaperarchive.co.uk
Danny Hargrave Memory Box Search at archive.castigersheritage.com
Search for "Danny Hargrave" at britishnewspaperarchive.co.uk

2019 deaths
Castleford Tigers players
English rugby league players
People from Kippax, West Yorkshire
Place of birth missing
Place of death missing
Rugby league five-eighths
Rugby league halfbacks
Year of birth missing